Mikayel Melkumyan (born 1 April 1962) is an Armenian politician. He was first elected to the Armenian National Assembly in 2012 as a member of the Prosperous Armenia Party. He was re-elected in the 2017 Armenian parliamentary election and subsequently chosen as one of three Deputy Speakers of the National Assembly.

Biography 

Mikayel Melkumyan was born on April 1, 1962 in Yerevan. He has served in the Soviet Army.

Education 
In 1983, Melkumyan graduated from Armenian State University of Economics, receiving the qualification of an economist. He later pursued his post-graduate studies at the same institution, earning the degree of a Doctor. Mikael Melkumyan also holds the title of Professor of Economics.

Career 
From 1987 until 1998, Melkumyan was a professor at the ASIE Chair of Industrial Economics. Between 1999-2000, he was the chief of staff at the Ministry of Social Security. Since 2000, he has been a professor at the ASUE Chair in Microeconomics and Entrepreneurial Activity. Also in 2000, Melkumyan was appointed a deputy minister of state property management, a post which he held until 2003.

Engagement in politics 
Melkumyan was elected to the Armenian National Assembly three times: on May 6, 2012 as a proportional representation candidate from the Prosperous Armenia party, on April 2, 2017 as a member of Tsarukyan Alliance, a political bloc led by Gagik Tsarukyan, the leader of the Prosperous Armenia party, and on December 9, 2018 again as a representative of Prosperous Armenia.

Personal life 
Mikayel Melkumyan is married and has three sons.

Published Works 
 Use of Secondary Raw in the Republic of Armenia: Existing Problems and Challenges, Yerevan, 1991
 Entrepreneurship and Investments, Yerevan, 1998
 State Property Management and Business, Yerevan, 2001
 Entrepreneurship and Business, Yerevan, 2006

Awards 
 Mkhitar Gosh Medal (2016)

References

1962 births
Living people
21st-century Armenian politicians